Lydekker Park is a  park in Harpenden, Hertfordshire. The land was formerly part of the garden of Harpenden Lodge, built in 1803, home for many years to the Lydekkers, one of the town's oldest families. Her intention was that the open space should be a memorial to her two brothers and her fiancé, all of whom died in World War I.

However, following the death of Miss Lydekker in 1987, shortly before her 101st birthday, her relatives were able to overturn the terms of her will, and the land was subsequently sold for development.  Harpenden Town Council made strenuous efforts to have all, or at least part of, the area retained as open space.  The Town Council had some measure of control as the developers were depending upon the Town Council to obtain planning permission to develop the site.  

In the end, only  out of the original 11 were given over to parkland and adjoining carpark, which is leased to the Harpenden Town Council at peppercorn rent.  The park was opened to the public on 1 July 1998.

Footnotes

Parks and open spaces in Hertfordshire
Harpenden